Hüseyin Köroğlu (born 18 June 1964 in Cyprus) is a Turkish Cypriot actor.

Partial filmography 

Gazoz Ağacı (1986)
Vurguna İnmek (1990, TV Mini-Series)
Sevdiğim Adam (1990)
Koltuk Belası (1990) - Akın
Gizli Merkez (1991, TV Mini-Series)
Mahallenin Muhtarları (1992)
Şaşkın Gelin (1993)
Çılgın Aşıklar (1993)
Yorgun Savaşçı (1993)
Şaban Askerde (1993, TV Series) - Yakışıklı
Tatlı Betüş (1993, TV Series)
Zzzzt FM (1994)
Geçmişin İzleri (1994)
Palavra Aşklar (1995, TV Series)
Bir Sevgi Anonsu (1995)
Ağustos Böceklerini Unutma (1996)
Garip Karşılaşma (1996)
Bir Nefes Sevgi (1996)
Baba Evi (1997) - Kaan
İlişkiler (1997, TV Series) - Murat
Kayikçi (1999) - Hristos
Tatlı Hayat (2001) - Tayfur
Hititler (2002)
Canım Kocacığım (2002) - Poyraz
Yaşamın Kıyısında (2003)
Zalim (2003, TV Series) - Aras
Tatil Aşkları (2004, TV Mini-Series) - Kaan
Sinema Bir Mucizedir / Büyülü Fener (2005) - Otello
Hayatım Sana Feda (2006, TV Series) - Hakan
İlk Aşkım (2006) - Sinan
Doktorlar (2006) - Ümit
Şölen (2007) - Hüseyin
Kendi Okulumuza Doğru (2008) - Kazım Bey
Görev Kıbrıs (2008) - Derviş
Kollama (2008, TV Series) - Pikeas
Tuzak (2009)
Kara Murat: Mora'nin atesi (2015)

References

External links
Official Website

1964 births
Living people
Turkish Cypriot actors
Turkish male film actors
Turkish film directors
People from North Nicosia